Polyneura is a cicada genus from Southeast Asia. Polyneura is a monotypic genus and the type species is Polyneura ducalis.

References

Polyneurini
Hemiptera of Asia
Cicadidae genera
Taxa named by John O. Westwood